Marila is a plant genus in the family Calophyllaceae. The genus comprises about 20 species, occurring in the Neotropics from Mexico and the Antilles to Bolivia.

Species include:
Marila grandiflora
Marila laxiflora
Marila saramaccana
Marila spiciformis

References

 
Malpighiales genera
Taxa named by Olof Swartz